GBHS WUM may refer to:
 Grey Bruce Health Services, Ontario, Canada

Schools 
 Glace Bay High School, Glace Bay, Nova Scotia, Canada
 Glen Burnie High School, Glen Burnie, Maryland, United States
 Gold Beach High School, Gold Beach, Oregon, United States
 Golden Bay High School, Takaka, New Zealand
 Gordon Bell High School, Winnipeg, Manitoba, Canada
 Grand Blanc Community High School, Grand Blanc, Michigan, United States
 Granite Bay High School, Granite Bay, California, United States
 Great Baddow High School, Chelmsford, Essex, England
 Great Bend High School, Great Bend, Kansas, United States
 Great Bridge High School, Chesapeake, Virginia, United States
 Gulf Breeze High School, Gulf Breeze, Florida, United States